Varnikai is a small village located in the Trakai District Municipality in Lithuania. The population is 75 inhabitants according to the 2011 census.

History 
On September 30, 1941, during World War II, 1,446 Jews (366 men, 483 women and 597 children) were murdered in Varnikai by Lithuanian policemen and white armbanders. The victims were gathered from nearby villages including Trakai. A memorial stone has been erected at the site of the massacre.

References 

Villages in Vilnius County
Trakai District Municipality
Holocaust locations in Lithuania